Nicholas Edward Julian Pocock (born 15 December 1951 in Maracaibo) is a Venezuelan-born cricketer who played for Hampshire County Cricket Club. Pocock was a right-handed batsman who bowled left-arm medium pace. He was educated at Shrewsbury School.

Pocock made his Hampshire debut during the 1976 County Championship season. From 1980 to 1984 Pocock captained Hampshire. Pocock retired from first-class cricket at the end of the 1984 County Championship season, after eight years with the club, four of which were as captain.

Following a successful career in county cricket, Pocock qualified as an ACII and worked for HSBC Insurance Brokers for over 10 years.  In 1992, he helped set up Sporting Index where he was employed as Marketing Director.  He is Vice Chairman of Hedgehog Risk Solutions, who specialise in providing bespoke insurance and financing solutions for corporations with sports related exposure. He is on the Marylebone Cricket Club (MCC) Committee.

References

External links
Nick Pocock on Cricinfo

1951 births
Living people
People educated at Shrewsbury School
English cricketers
Hampshire cricketers
Hampshire cricket captains
Sportspeople from Maracaibo